Straupe Parish is an administrative unit of Cēsis Municipality in the Vidzeme region of Latvia (Prior to 2009, it was an administrative unit of Cēsis District). The administrative center is the village of Plācis.

Towns, villages and settlements of Straupe parish 
 Brasla
 Mazstraupe
  - parish administrative center
 Pušpūri
 Straupe
 Strautiņi

References 

Parishes of Latvia
Cēsis Municipality
Vidzeme